Hykeham railway station serves both the town of North Hykeham and Lincoln city suburbs of Birchwood and Boultham Moor in Lincolnshire, England. The station is on the Nottingham to Lincoln Central Line, owned by Network Rail and managed by East Midlands Railway, which provide all the services.

History

Diesel multiple units were introduced to provide services at the station in 1958. In the 1980s, services at the station were diverted to run into Lincoln Central with St Marks station being closed.

Stationmasters

W.G. Watkins ca. 1860 ca. 1871
C.O. Brown 1873 - 1874
S. Stanley 1874 - 1880
James B. Palmer 1880 - 1886 
John Walters 1886 - 1888 (afterwards station master at Plumtree)
E.C. Harvey 1888 - 1890
Charles Bateman 1890 - 1893
H.E. Wiltshire 1893 - 1894
H.W. Bethell 1894 - 1898
George Edward Cramp 1898 - 1903 (afterwards station master at Widmerpool)
Robert Arthur Gill 1903 - 1913 (later station master at Harlington)
George Edwin Stapleton from 1913 (formerly station master at Bleasby)
J.W. Flint until 1937 (afterwards station master at Sileby)
J.R. Needham from 1937 (formerly station master at Dunchurch)

Facilities
The station has two platforms, which are staggered over a level crossing and feature basic facilities. The full range of tickets for travel are purchased from the guard on the train at no extra cost as there are no ticket machines at the station which is also unstaffed, with modern help points being available for passenger information.

The station has a small cycle rack as well as a free car park at its entrance. Step-free access is available to both the platforms at the station.

Services
All services at Hykeham are operated by East Midlands Railway.

The station is also served by two trains per day to and one train per day from London St Pancras International which are operated using a Class 222 Meridian. 

A roughly hourly service also serves the station on Sundays although services run only as far as Nottingham and do not serve stations to Leicester. There are no services to London on Sundays.

Bus connections
No regular buses directly serve the station although the Stagecoach East Midlands routes 15 and 16 between Lincoln and North Hykeham both stop a short distance away on Newark Road. The PC coaches routes 47, 48 and 49 to Newark-on-Trent, Bassingham and Witham St Hughs also stop near the station.

References

External links

Railway stations in Lincolnshire
DfT Category F2 stations
Former Midland Railway stations
Railway stations in Great Britain opened in 1846
Railway stations served by East Midlands Railway
1846 establishments in England